Herman Bennett (born 22 December 1939) is a Jamaican cricketer. He played eleven first-class matches for Jamaica between 1964 and 1970.

References

External links
 

1939 births
Living people
Jamaican cricketers
Jamaica cricketers
People from Saint Catherine Parish